Arthur Hutchinson  (6 July 1866 – 12 December 1937) was a British mineralogist.  During World War I, and at the request of the Admiralty, he was asked to design gas masks suitable for the Navy; for his work, he was awarded the OBE.  Hutchinson was elected a Fellow of the Royal Society in 1922.  He was master of Pembroke College, Cambridge, from 1928 to 1937, served on the Council of the Royal Society from 1932 to 1934, and was the Society's Vice-President for the year 1933-34.

Life

Hutchinson  was born in London on 6 July 1866.  His father was George Hutchinson of Woodside, Westmorland, and his mother was Deborah Richardson of Culgaith in Cumberland.  He was educated at Clifton College and Christ's College, Cambridge, where he obtained first classes in both parts of the Natural Sciences Tripos, taking Part II in Chemistry with Mineralogy as a subsidiary subject in 1888.  He took his PhD on a chemical thesis 'On the reduction of aromatic amides'.

During World War I, and at the request of the Admiralty, he was asked to design gas masks suitable for the Navy; for his work, he was awarded the OBE.  Hutchinson was elected a Fellow of the Royal Society in 1922.  He was master of Pembroke College, Cambridge, from 1928 to 1937, served on the Council of the Royal Society from 1932 to 1934, and was a vice-president for the year 1933-34.

Hutchinson and his wife entertained Gandhi at Pembroke College, Cambridge.

Arthur Hutchinson is buried in the Parish of the Ascension Burial Ground in Cambridge, with his wife Evaline Hutchinson, the sister of Sir Arthur Shipley GBE FRS, who lived from 1864 to 1960.  Their son was G. Evelyn Hutchinson, also an academic and considered to be the founder of Limnology.

Notes

References
 ‘HUTCHINSON, Arthur’, Who Was Who, A & C Black, an imprint of Bloomsbury Publishing plc, 1920–2008; online edn, Oxford University Press, Dec 2007 accessed 28 Feb 2013

External links
 

1866 births
1937 deaths
Masters of Pembroke College, Cambridge
Fellows of the Royal Society
Officers of the Order of the British Empire
British mineralogists
Alumni of Christ's College, Cambridge
People educated at Clifton College
Professors of Mineralogy (Cambridge)